The Archeparchy of Prešov (until 2008 Eparchy of Prešov) is a Slovak Greek Catholic Church ecclesiastical territory or archeparchy of the Catholic Church in Slovakia.  Its territory covers the Prešov Region.
 
 it had 136,593 Slovak Greek Catholic faithful under its jurisdiction. and its episcopal see is Prešov, where it has the cathedral see Greckokatolícka katedrálny chrám sv. Jána Krstiteľa; it also has a minor basilica Farský chrám Nanebovzatia Presvätej Bohorodičky, bazilika minor, in Ľutina. Current archeparch is the Ján Babjak, S.J.

It is the sole metropolitan see of Slovak Greek Catholic Church and has two suffragan eparchies: the Eparchy of Košice and the Eparchy of Bratislava.

History 
Established on June 27, 1787 as Vicariate of Košice, on territory of the Greek Catholic Eparchy of Mukachevo, to embrace the western part of this eparchy. Later the see of the Vicariate was transferred from Košice to Prešov.

The eparchy was erected on 22 September 1818 from the territory of the Eparchy of Mukachevo.
 
Still in the Habsburg imperial age, on 1912.06.08 it lost its Hungarian territory to establish the Hungarian Greek Catholic Eparchy of Hajdúdorog (now the Hungarian Catholic Archeparchy of Hajdúdorog).
 
In July 1995, it enjoyed a papal visit by John Paul II.
On 18 January 1996 the eparchy lost its Czech territory to the newly established Ruthenian Greek Catholic Church's Apostolic Exarchate in the Czech Republic. On 17 January 1997, an apostolic exarchate of Košice (today Eparchy of Košice) was created, again split from its former territory.
 
The last changes occurred on 30 January 2008, when the Eparchy of Bratislava was erected, to which Prešov lost territory of western and central Slovakia. At the same time it was elevated into a Metropolitan archeparchy sui juris.

Episcopal incumbents 
 Bishops of Prešov (Slovak Rite)
 Gregor Tarkovič (1818.09.26 – 1841.01.16)
 Jozef Gaganec (1843-1875)
 ThDr. Mikuláš Tóth (1876-1882)
 ThDr. Ján Vályi (1882-1911)
 ThDr. Štefan Novák (1913-1918)
 ThDr. Mikuláš Rusnák (1918-1922), Vicar General
 Dionisije Njaradi (1922-1927), Apostolic Administrator
 Pavel Peter Gojdič, OSBM (1927-1960)
 auxiliary bishop ThDr. Vasiľ Hopko (1947-1976)
 Mons. Ján Hirka (1969–2002), until 1989 as Apostolic Administrator
 auxiliary bishop Milan Chautur, C.Ss.R. (1992–1997)
 Bishop Ján Babjak, S.J. (2002.12.11 – 2008.01.30, cfr. infra: later first Metropolitan Archeparch)

 Metropolitan Archeparchs of Prešov (Slovak Rite)
 Archbishop Ján Babjak, S.J. (2008.01.30 – 2022.04.22), ''as above: previously bishop of Prešov
 auxiliary bishop Milan Lach, S.J. (2013–2017)

References

External links 
 Official site
 GigaCatholic, with Episcipla incumbents list, linking to biographies

Catholic Church in Slovakia
Catholic dioceses in Slovakia
Prešov
Slovak Greek Catholic Church